The Legend pipe is a diatreme associated with the Birch Mountains kimberlite field in northern Alberta, Canada. It is thought to have formed about 75 million years ago during the Late Cretaceous period.

See also
Volcanism of Canada
Volcanism of Western Canada
List of volcanoes in Canada

References

Birch Mountains kimberlite field